Superheroes was a Danish pop/rock band that split up in 2006.

Members 
Thomas Troelsen (Vocals, Synthesiser)
Thomas Christensen (drums)
Tanja Simonsen (Vocals, Synthesiser)
Lars Hovendahl (Bass guitar)
Bjarke Staun (Guitar)
Asger Tarpgaard (Guitar)

Discography

Albums
Superheroes (2002 Crunchy Frog Records)
Igloo (2000 Crunchy Frog Records)
Dancing Casanova (1998 Crunchy Frog Records)

Singles & EPs
"The Ocean Diver" (2003 Crunchy Frog Records)
"Las Vegas" (2001 Crunchy Frog Records)
"Johnny and I" (1999 Crunchy Frog Records)
"See You at the Railroads" (1998 Crunchy Frog Records)
"Superheroes" (Demo No Label)

External links
 Superheroes web page

Danish pop music groups
Danish rock music groups